Boudot is a surname. Notable people with the surname include:

 (1851-1930), French painter
Martin Boudot (born 1985), French investigative journalist and documentary filmmaker
Paul Boudot (1571–1635), bishop of Saint-Omer and bishop of Arras
Pierre-Charles Boudot (born 1992), French flat racing jockey

See also
Baudo (disambiguation)